Merkel (also Merckel or Merkl) is a common German surname. It used to be the minimization of a variety of Old German given names like Markwart (meaning "guard of the frontier") or Markhard (meaning "strong frontier").
 Alexander Merkel (born 1992), Kazakh-born German footballer
 Angela Merkel (born 1954), former Chancellor of Germany
 Crawford Merkel (1906–1987), American bobsledder
 Earl Merkel (born 1955), American writer
 Fred Merkel (born 1962), American motorcycle road racer
 Friedrich Sigmund Merkel (1845–1919), German anatomist
 Garlieb Merkel (1769–1850), Baltic German writer and activist
 Gerhard Merkl (1961–2016), German Domkapellmeister
 Günther Merkel, East German slalom canoer
 Gustav Merkel (1827–1885), German composer
 Harry Merkel (1918–1995), German racecar driver
 Jim Merkel (born 1957), American environmental activist and engineer
 Manfred Merkel (born 1938), East German slalom canoer
 Max Merkel (1918–2006), Austrian footballer and football manager
 Monte Merkel (1916–1981), American football player
 Philip Merkel (1811–1899; better known as Philipp Merkle), German-American Freethinker and preacher
 Pierre Merkel (born 1989), German footballer
 Reiner Merkel (1952–2007), German photojournalist
 Therese Merkel (born 1970), member of the Swedish band Alcazar
 Una Merkel (1903–1986), American actress
 Willy Merkl (1900–1934), German mountain climber
 Peter H Merkl (born 1932), German political scientist PhD
 John Merkl (born 1965), American photographer

See also
 Merkel Landis (1875–1960), American businessman and lawyer
 Merkel (disambiguation)
 Merkle (disambiguation)

References

German-language surnames

Surnames from given names